The USBBY Outstanding International Books List (The OIB List) is an initiative of the United States section of the International Board on Books for Young People (USBBY) to produce an annual list of the outstanding children's books from around the world.

Background
The Outstanding International Books (OIB) list began in 2006. Each year, books are selected by a committee appointed from the membership of USBBY, the United States section of the International Board on Books for Young People (IBBY). The aim is to promote the best of international children’s literature, to introduce young people to outstanding authors and illustrators from other countries, and to help children and young people in the United States to see the world from diverse perspectives.

The 16th OIB List (2021)
A total of 42 books were selected.

GRADES PreK-2
 Ahmed, Sufiya. Under the Great Plum Tree. Illus. by Reza Dalvand. Tiny Owl. (UK)
 Atinuke. Catch that Chicken! Illus. by Angela Brooksbank. Candlewick.(UK/Set in West Africa)
 Berry, James. A Story About Afiya. Illus. by Anna Cunha. Lantana. (UK)
 Cotter, Sacha. Cannonball. Illus. by Josh Morgan. Sourcebooks/Sourcebooks Jabberwocky. (New Zealand)
 David, Gauthier. Letters from Bear. Trans. from French by Sarah Ardizzone. Illus by Marie Caudry. Eerdmans Books for Young Readers. (Belgium)
 Frankel, Yael. The Elevator. Trans. from Spanish by Kit Maude. Tapioca Stories. (Argentina)
 Hrab, Naseem. Weekend Dad. Illus. by Frank Viva. Groundwood. (Canada)
 Júnior, Otávio. From My Window. Trans. from Portuguese by Beatriz C. Dias. Illus. by Vanina Starkoff. Barefoot Books. (Brazil)
 Maclear, Kyo. Story Boat. Illus. by Rashin Kheiriyeh. Tundra. (Canada)
 Stinson, Kathy. The Lady with the Books: A Story Inspired by the Remarkable Work of Jella Lepman. Illus. by Marie Lafrance. Kids Can Press. (Canada)
 Van de Vendel, Edward. Little Fox. Trans. from Dutch by David Colmer. Illus. by Marije Tolman. Levine Querido/Em Querido. (Netherlands)
 Weightman, Magnus. All Along the River. Trans. from Dutch by author. Illus. by author. Clavis Publishing. (Belgium)
 Wernicke, María. Some Days. Trans. from Spanish by Lawrence Schimel. Illus. by author. Amazon Crossing Kids. (Argentina)
 Yoshitake, Shinsuke. There Must Be More Than That! Ed. by Naomi Kirsten from translation. Illus. by author. Chronicle Books. (Japan)
GRADES 3-5
 Almond, David. War is Over. Illus. by David Litchfield. Candlewick. (UK)
 Ferrada, María José. Mexique: A Refugee Story from the Spanish Civil War. Trans. from Spanish by Elisa Amado. Illus. by Ana Penyas. Eerdmans Books For Young Readers. (Mexico)
 Järvinen, Aino. 1,001 Creatures. Trans. from Finnish by Emily Jeremiah. Illus. by Laura Merz. Restless Books. (Finland)
 Krone, Bridget. Small Mercies. Illus. by Karen Vermeulen. Catalyst Press. (South Africa)
 Lam, Thao. The Paper Boat: A Refugee Story. Illus. by author. Owlkids Books. (Canada/Vietnam)
 McKay, Hilary. The Time of Green Magic. Simon & Schuster/McElderry Books. (UK)
 McLachlan, Jenny. The Land of Roar. Illus. by Ben Mantle. HarperCollins/Harper. (UK)
 Mian, Zanib. Planet Omar: Accidental Trouble Magnet. Illus. by Nasaya Mafaridik. Penguin/G.P. Putnam’s Sons. (UK)
 Nilsson, Ulf. All the Dear Little Animals. Trans. from Swedish by Julia Marshall. Illus. by Eva Eriksson. Gecko Press. (Sweden)
 Romanyshyn, Romana & Lesiv, Andriy. Sound: Shhh...Bang...POP... BOOM! Trans. from Ukrainian by Vitaly Chernetsky. Illus. by authors. Chronicle/Handprint. (Ukraine)
 Roskifte, Kristin. Everybody Counts: A Counting Story from 0 to 7.5 Billion. Trans.from Norwegian by Siân Mackie. Illus. by author. The Quarto Group/ Wide Eyed Editions. (Norway)
 Utkin, Alexander. Gamayun Tales I. Trans. from Russian by Lada Morozova. Illus. by author. Nobrow. (UK/Russia)
 Yabouza, Adrienne. The Magic Doll: A Children’s Book Inspired by African Art. Trans. from French by Paul Kelly. Illus. by Élodie Nouhen. Prestel. (France/set in Central African Republic)
GRADES 6-8
 Aung Thin, Michelle. Crossing the Farak River. Annick Press. (Australia/set in Myanmar)
 Billet, Julia. Catherine’s War. Trans. from French by Ivanka Hahnenberger. Illus. by Claire Fauvel. HarperCollins/HarperAlley. (France)
 Fagan, Cary. Maurice and His Dictionary: A True Story. Illus. by Enzo Lord Mariano. Owlkids Books. (Canada)
 Kadarusman, Michelle. Music for Tigers. Pajama Press. (Canada/set in Australia)
 Pêgo, Ana & Martins, Isabel Minhós. Plasticus Maritimus: An Invasive Species. Trans. from Portuguese by Jane Springer. Illus. by Bernardo P. Carvalho. Greystone Books/Greystone Kids in partnership with the David Suzuki Institute. (Portugal)
 Robertson, David A. The Barren Grounds. Illus. by Natasha Donovan. Penguin Random House Canada Young Readers/Puffin. (Canada)
 Van den Ende, Peter. The Wanderer. Illus. by author. Levine Querido/Em Querido. (Netherlands)
 Watanabe, Issa. Migrants. Illus. by author. Gecko Press. (Mexico)
GRADES 9-12
 Bhathena, Tanaz. Hunted by the Sky. Macmillan/Farrar Straus Giroux.(Canada)
 Cuthew, Lucy. Blood Moon. Candlewick/Walker. (UK)
 Hardinge, Frances. Deeplight. Abrams/Amulet. (UK)
 Kaito. Blue Flag, Vol. 1. Trans. from Japanese by Adrienne Beck. Illus. by author. VIZ Media. (Japan)
 Thakur, Sophia. Somebody Give This Heart a Pen. Candlewick/Walker. (UK)
 Yu, Zhiying. The Ode to the Goddess of the Luo River. Adapted and trans. from Chinese by author. Illus. by Ye Luying. minedition. (China)

The 15th OIB List (2020)
A total of 42 books were selected.

GRADES PreK-2
 Abadia, Ximo. The Farmer. Trans. by Grace Maccarone & Kelly Loughman. Illus. by the author. Holiday House Publishing. (Switzerland)
 Avingaq, Susan & Vsetula, Maren. The Pencil. Illus. by Charlene Chua. Inhabit Media. (Canada)
 Basil, Krystia. A Sky Without Lines. Illus. by Laura Borràs. minedition. (Hong Kong/set along US/Mexico border)
 Chernysheva, Natalia. The Return. Illus. by the author. Groundwood Books. (Portugal)
 Dekko, Espen. Paws+Edward. Trans. by Kids Can Press. Illus. by Mari Kanstad Johnsen. Kids Can Press. (Norway)
 Flett, Julie. Birdsong. Illus. by the author. Greystone Kids. (Canada)
 Iglesias, Juan Pablo. Daniel and Ismail. Trans. by Ilan Stavans, Eliezer Nowodworski, Frieda Press-Danieli, and Randa Sayegh. Illus. by Alex Peris. Yonder. (Chile)
 Lee, Hyeon-Ju. The Happiest Tree: A Story of Growing Up. llus. by the author. Feiwel and Friends. (Korea)
 Meddour, Wendy. Lubna and Pebble. Illus. by Daniel Egnéus. Dial Books for Young Readers. (UK)
 Ram, Praba & Preuitt, Sheela. Thukpa for All. Illus. by Shilpa Ranade. Karadi Tales Company. (India)
 Read, Kate. One Fox: A Counting Book Thriller. Illus. by the author. Peachtree Publishing Company. (UK)
 Tanco, Miguel. Count on Me. Illus. by the author. Tundra Books. (Canada)
 Vermette, Katherena. The Girl and the Wolf. Illus. by Julie Flett. Theytus Books. (Canada)
 Vilela, Fernando. Along the Tapajós. Trans. by Daniel Hahn. Illus. by the author. Amazon Crossing Kids. (Brazil)
 Yoshitake, Shinsuke. The Boring Book. Ed. by Naomi Kirsten from translation. Illus. by the author. Chronicle Books. (Japan)
GRADES 3-5
 Abela, Deborah. The Most Marvelous International Spelling Bee. Sourcebooks Jabberwocky. (Australia)
 Alvarez, Lorena. Hicotea: A Nightlights Story. Illus. by the author. Nobrow. (UK)
 Blackcrane, Gerelchimeg. The Moose of Ewenki. Trans. by Helen Mixter. Illus. by Jiu Er. Greystone Kids. (China)
 Dahle, Gro. Angryman. Trans. by Tara Chace. Illus by Svein Nyhus. NorthSouth Books. (Norway)
 Huson, Brett D. The Grizzly Mother. Illus. by Natasha Donovan. HighWater Press. (Canada)
 Hutchinson, Michael. The Case of Windy Lake. Second Story Press. (Canada)
 Ørbeck-Nilssen, Constance. Vanishing Colors. Trans. by Kari Dickson. Illus. by Akin Duzakin. Eerdmans Books for Young Readers. (Norway)
 Rundell, Katherine. The Good Thieves. Simon & Schuster Books for Young Readers. (UK/set in US)
 Smith, Heather. The Phone Booth in Mr. Hirota’s Garden. Illus.by Rachel Wada. Orca Book Publishers. (Canada/set in Japan)
 Taylor, Sean & the Khayaal Theatre. Riding a Donkey Backwards: Wise and Foolish Tales of Mulla Nasruddin. Illus. by Shirin Adl. Candlewick Press. (UK)
 Vafaeian, Marjan. The Parrot and the Merchant: A Tale by Rumi. Trans. by Azita Rassi. Illus. by the author. Tiny Owl Publishing. (Iran)
GRADES 6-8
 Argueta, Jorge. Caravan to the North: Misael’s Long Walk. Trans. by Elizabeth Bell. Illus. by Manuel Monroy. Groundwood Books. (Canada/set in Central America)
 Gourlay, Candy. Bone Talk. Scholastic. (UK/set in the Philippines)
 Kadarusman, Michelle. Girl of the Southern Sea. Pajama Press. (Canada/set in Indonesia)
 Litvina, Alexandra. The Apartment: A Century of Russian History. Trans. by Antonina W. Bouis. Illus. by Anna Desnitskaya. Abrams Books for Young Readers. (Russia)
 Mello, Roger. Charcoal Boys. Trans. by Daniel Hahn. Illus. by the author. Elsewhere Editions. (Brazil)
 Polak, Monique. The Taste of Rain. Orca Book Publishers. (Canada/set in China)
 Ross, Alisa. The Girl Who Rode a Shark: And Other Stories of Daring Women. Illus. by Amy Blackwell. Pajama Press. (Canada)
 Strange, Lucy. Our Castle by the Sea. Chicken House. (UK)
 Vecchini, Silvia. The Red Zone: An Earthquake Story. Trans. by Anna Barton. Illus. by Sualzo. Amulet Books. (Italy)
GRADES 9-12
 Adams, K.C. Perception: A Photo Series. Illus. by the author. HighWater Press. (Canada)
 Fried, Hédi. Questions I Am Asked About the Holocaust. Trans. by Alice E. Olsson. Scribe Publications. (Sweden)
 Kwaymullina Ambelin & Kwaymullina, Ezekiel. The Things She’s Seen. Alfred A. Knopf. (Australia)
 Magnason, Andri Snær. The Casket of Time. Trans. by Björg Árnadóttir & Andrew Cauthery. Yonder. (Iceland)
 Petreca, Guilherme. Ye. Trans. by Andrea Rosenberg. Illus. by the author. Top Shelf Productions. (Brazil)
 Sedgwick, Marcus & Sedgwick, Julian. Voyages in the Underworld of Orpheus Black. Illus. by Alexis Deacon. Walker Books. (UK)
 Various authors. This Place: 150 Years Retold. Illus. by various artists. HighWater Press. (Canada)

The 14th OIB List (2019)

A total of 39 titles were selected.

Pre K-2
 Buitrago, Jairo. On the Other Side of the Garden. Trans. by Elisa Amado. Illus. by Rafael Yockteng. Groundwood Books. (Chile)
 Chabbert, Ingrid. A Drop of the Sea. Trans. from French. Illus. by Guridi. Kids Can Press. (France)
 Clarke, Maxine Beneba. The Patchwork Bike. Illus. by Van Thanh Rudd. Candlewick Press. (Australia)
 Crowther, Kitty. Stories of the Night. Trans. by Julia Marshall. Illus. by the author. Gecko Press. (Sweden)
 de Arias, Patricia. Marwan’s Journey. Trans. from Spanish. Illus. by Laura Borràs. Minedition. (Chile)
 Dubuc, Marianne. Up the Mountain Path. Illus. by the author. Princeton Architectural Press. (Canada)
 Gomi, Taro. I Really Want to See You, Grandma. Trans. from Japanese. Illus. by the author. Chronicle Books. (Japan)
 Grant, Shauntay. Africville. Illus. by Eva Campbell. Groundwood Books. (Canada)
 Kaadan, Nadine. Tomorrow. Trans. and Illus. by the author. Lantana Publishing. (Syria)
 Latour, Francie. Auntie Luce’s Talking Paintings. Illus. by Ken Daley. Groundwood Books. (Canada/set in Haiti)
 Nilsson, Ulf. A Case for Buffy. Trans. by Julia Marshall. Illus. by Gitte Spee. Gecko Press. (Sweden)
 Sanna, Francesca. Me and My Fear. Illus. by the author. Flying Eye Books. (UK)
 Soundar, Chitra. Farmer Falgu Goes to the Market. Illus. by Kanika Nair. Karadi Tales. (India)

Grades 3-5
 Blexbolex. Vacation. Illus. by the author. Enchanted Lion. (France)
 Duprat, Guillaume. Eye Spy: Wild Ways Animals See the World. Trans. by Patrick Skipworth. Illus. by the author. What On Earth Books. (France)
 Edwards, Nicola. What a Wonderful Word. Illus. by Luisa Uribe. Kane Miller. (UK)
 Gifford, Clive. The Colors of History: How Colors Shaped the World. Illus. by Marc-Etienne Peintre. Quarto Publishing. (UK)
 Green, Shari. Missing Mike. Pajama Press. (Canada)
 Ho, Van & Skrypuch, Marsha Forchuk. Too Young to Escape. Pajama Press. (Canada/set in Vietnam)
 Kacer, Kathy. The Sound of Freedom. Annick Press. (Canada)
 Kinew, Wab. Go Show the World: A Celebration of Indigenous Heroes. Illus. by Joe Morse. Tundra Books. (Canada)
 Lewis, Gill. A Story Like the Wind. Illus. by Jo Weaver. Eerdmans Publishing. (UK)
 Parr, Maria. Astrid the Unstoppable. Trans. by Guy Puzey. Illus. by Katie Harnett. Candlewick Press. (Norway)
 Walters, Eric. From the Heart of Africa: A Book of Wisdom. Illus. include original art from African countries. Tundra Books. (Canada)
 Widmark, Martin. The House of Lost and Found. Trans. by Polly Lawson. Illus. by Emilia Dziubak. Floris Books. (Sweden)
 Wilcox, Merrie-Ellen. After Life: Ways We Think About Death. Orca Book Publishers. (Canada)
 Winter, Ali. Peace and Me. Illus. by Mickaël El Fathi. Lantana Publishing. (UK)

Grades 6-8
 Bailey, Linda. Mary Who Wrote Frankenstein. Illus. by Júlia Sardà. Tundra Books. (Canada)
 Ellis, Sarah. Dodger Boy. Groundwood Books. (Canada)
 First News/Walker Books Ltd. Voices from the Second World War: Stories of War as Told to Children of Today. Candlewick Press. (UK)
 Hargrave, Kiran Millwood. The Island at the End of Everything. Alfred A. Knopf. (UK/set in the Philippines)
 Nielsen, Susin. No Fixed Address. Penguin Random House Canada Young Readers. (Canada)
 Orr, Wendy. Swallow's Dance. Pajama Press. (Canada)
 Smith, Heather. Ebb & Flow. Kids Can Press. (Canada)
 Tregonning, Mel. Small Things. Illus. by the author. Pajama Press. (Australia)
 Williamson, Victoria. The Fox Girl and the White Gazelle. Floris Books. (Scotland)

Grades 9-12
 Barter, Catherine. Troublemakers. Carolrhoda Books. (UK)
 Mills, Jean. Skating Over Thin Ice. Red Deer Press. (Canada)
 Ntshingila, Futhi. We Kiss Them With Rain. Catalyst Press. (South Africa)

The 13th OIB List (2018)
A total of 38 titles were selected. 
Pre K-2
 ATINUKE, You’re Amazing, Anna Hibiscus! illus. by Lauren Tobia
 BUITRAGO, Jairo. Walk With Me. tr. by Elisa Amado. illus. by Rafael Yockteng
 CHRISTOPHER, Danny. Putuguq & Kublu. illus. by Astrid Arijanto. Inhabit Media. (Iqaluit) (Canada)
 FULLERTON, Alma. When the Rain Comes. illus. by Kim La Fave. Pajama Pr.
 GAN, Dayong. Little Rabbit’s Questions. tr. by Helen Wang. illus. by author. Candied Plums. (China)
 HOHN, Nadia L. Malaika’s Winter Carnival. illus. by Irene Luxbacher. Groundwood. (Canada)
 HONG, Nari. Days With Dad. illus. by author. Enchanted Lion. (South Korea)
 JOCELYN, Marthe. Sam Sorts (One Hundred Favorite Things). illus. by author. Tundra. (Canada)
 KRAULIS, Julie. A Pattern for Pepper. illus. by author. Tundra. (Canada)
 MIYAKOSHI, Akiko. The Way Home in the Night. illus. by author. Kids Can Pr. (Japan)
 PARKER, Danny. Molly & Mae. illus. by Freya Blackwood. HMH. (Australia)
 SCHWARTZ, Joanne. Town Is by the Sea. illus. by Sydney Smith. Groundwood. (Canada)
 SHER, Emil. Away. illus. by Qin Leng. Groundwood. (Canada)
 SIMLER, Isabelle. Plume. illus. by author. Eerdmans. (France)
 STARKOFF, Vanina. Along the River. tr. by Jane Springer. illus. by author. Groundwood. (Brazil)
 USHER, Sam. Rain. illus. by author. Candlewick/Templar Bks. (UK)
Grades 3–5
 BATE, Helen. Peter in Peril: Courage and Hope in World War Two. illus. by author. Otter-Barry Books. (UK/set in Hungary)
 CAO, Wenxuan. Bronze and Sunflower. tr. by Helen Wang. illus. by Meilo So. Candlewick. (China)
 CAO, Wenxuan. Feather. tr. by Chloe Garcia Roberts. illus. by Roger Mello. Elsewhere Editions. (China)
 FLINT, Shamini. Ten: A Soccer Story. Clarion. (Singapore/set in Malaysia)
 FRIER, Raphaëlle. Malala: Activist for Girls’ Education. tr. by Julie Cormier. illus. by Aurélia Fronty. Charlesbridge. (France/set in Pakistan)
 GOLDSTYN, Jacques. Bertolt. tr. by Claudia Zoe Bedrick. illus. by author. Enchanted Lion. (Canada)
 HARBRIDGE, Paul. When the Moon Comes. illus. by Matt James. Tundra. (Canada)
 IWASA, Migumi. Yours Sincerely, Giraffe. tr. by Cathy Hirano. illus. by Jun Takabatake. Gecko. (Japan)
 KULLING, Monica. Mary Anning’s Curiosity. illus. by Melissa Castrillon. Groundwood.
 LEACH, Sara. Slug Days . illus. by Rebecca Bender. Pajama Pr. (Canada)
 MELLO, Roger. You Can’t Be Too Careful! tr. by Daniel Hahn. illus. by author. Elsewhere Editions. (Brazil)
 VALCKX, Catharina. Bruno: Some of the More Interesting Days in My Life So Far. tr. by Antony Shugaar. illus. by Nicolas Hubesch. Gecko. (France)
Grades 6–8
 BRITT, Fanny. Louis Undercover. tr. by Christelle Morelli & Susan Ouriou. illus. by Isabelle Arsenault. Groundwood. (Canada)
 GREEN, Shari. Macy McMillan and the Rainbow Goddess. Pajama Pr. (Canada)
 HARDINGE, Frances. A Face Like Glass. Abrams/Amulet. (UK)
 KULLAB, Samya. Escape From Syria. illus. by Jackie Roche. Colors by Mike Freiheit. Firefly. (Canada/set in Lebanon)
 WEGELIUS, Jakob. The Murderer’s Ape. tr. by Peter Graves. illus. by author. Delacorte. (Sweden)
Grades 9–12
 CROWLEY, Cath. Words in Deep Blue. Knopf. (Australia)
 HARDINGE, Frances. A Skinful of Shadows. Abrams/ Amulet. (UK)
 KWAYMULLINA, Ambelin. The Foretelling of Georgie Spider. Candlewick. (Australia)
 MAYHEW, Julie. The Big Lie. Candlewick. (UK)
 SMITH, Heather. The Agony of Bun O’Keefe. Penguin Teen Canada. (Canada)

The 12th OIB List (2017)  
A total of 41 titles were selected.
Pres-Gr 2
 DEGENNARO, Sue. The Pros and Cons of Being a Frog. illus. by the author. S. & S./Paula Wiseman Bks. Australia.
 DUBUC, Marianne. The Animals’ Ark. tr. from French. illus. by author. Kids Can. Canada.
 HIRST, Daisy. The Girl with the Parrot on her Head. illus. by author. Candlewick. UK.
 HOHN, Nadia L. Malaika’s Costume. illus. by Irene Luxbacher. Groundwood. Canada/set in the Caribbean.
 LANTHIER, Jennifer. Hurry Up, Henry. illus. by Isabelle Malenfant. Puffin. Canada.
 LEROY, Jean. A Well-Mannered Young Wolf. tr. from French. illus. by Matthieu Maudet. Eerdmans. France.
 O’LEARY, Sara. A Family Is a Family Is a Family. illus. by Qin Leng. Groundwood. Canada.
 ROCHA, Ruth. Lines, Squiggles, Letters, Words. tr. from Portuguese by Lyn Miller-Lachmann. illus. by Madalena Matoso. Enchanted Lion. Brazil.
 SANNA, Francesca. The Journey. illus. by author. Flying Eye. UK.
 STARK, Ulf. The Midsummer Tomte and the Little Rabbits. tr. from Swedish by Susan Beard. illus. by Eva Eriksson. Floris. Sweden.
 VISWANATH, Shobha. The Blue Jackal. illus. by Dileep Joshi. Eerdmans. India.
Grades 3–5
 ARGUETA, Jorge. Somos Como Las Nubes/We Are Like the Clouds. tr. by Elisa Amado. illus. by Alfonso Ruano. Groundwood. Canada.
 CORNILLE, Didier. Who Built That? Bridges: An Introduction to Ten Great Bridges and Their Designers. tr. from French by Yolanda Stern Broad. illus. by author. Princeton Architectural. France.
 FABER, Polly. Mango & Bambang, the Not-a-Pig. illus. by Clara Vulliamy. Candlewick. UK.
 FENTON, Corinne. Bob the Railway Dog: The True Story of an Adventurous Dog. illus. by Andrew McLean. Candlewick. Australia.
 HURST, Elise. Imagine a City. illus. by author. Doubleday. Canada.
 KRISHNASWAMI, Uma. Book Uncle and Me. illus. by Julianna Swaney. Groundwood. Canada/set in India.
 KUHLMANN, Torben. Armstrong: The Adventurous Journey of a Mouse to the Moon. tr. from German by David Henry Wilson. illus. by the author. NorthSouth. Germany.
 KUHN, Camilla. Samira and the Skeletons. tr. from Norwegian by Don Bartlett. illus. by author. Eerdmans. Norway.
 LAGERCRANTZ, Rose. Life According to Dani. tr. from Swedish by Julia Marshall. illus. by Eva Eriksson. Gecko. Sweden.
 MARTINS, Isabel Minhós. Don’t Cross the Line. tr. from Portuguese by Daniel Hahn. illus. by Bernardo P. Carvalho. Gecko. Portugal.
 MULLER, Gerda. A Year in Our New Garden. tr. from German. illus. by the author. Floris. Germany.
 PARVELA, Timo. Bicycling to the Moon. tr. from Finnish by Ruth Urbom. illus. by Virpi Talfitie. Gecko. Finland.
 PINFOLD, Levi. Greenling. illus. by the author. Candlewick/Templar. Australia.
 ROSSELL, Judith. Withering by Sea. illus. by the author. S. & S./Atheneum. Australia.
 SANABRIA, JOSÉ. As Time Went By. tr. from German. illus. by the author. NorthSouth. Switzerland.
Grades 6–8
 BOGART, Jo Ellen. The White Cat and the Monk: A Retelling of the Poem “Pangur Ban” illus. by Sydney Smith. Groundwood. Canada.
 Longbow-GirlDAVIES, Linda. Longbow Girl. Scholastic/Chicken House. UK.
 HARDSTAFF, Jane. The Executioner’s Daughter. Lerner/Carolrhoda. UK.
 LEA, Synne. Night Guard. tr. from Norwegian by John Irons. illus. by Stian Hole. Eerdmans. Norway.
 LUURTSEMA, Nat. Goldfish. Feiwel and Friends. UK.
 STEVENSON, Robin. Pride: Celebrating Diversity and Community. Orca. Canada.
 SVINGEN, Arne. The Ballad of a Broken Nose. tr. from Norwegian by Kari Dickinson. S. & S./Margaret K. McElderry Bks. Norway.
Grades 9–12
 ACIOLI, Socorro. The Head of the Saint. tr. from Portuguese by Daniel Hahn. Delacorte. Brazil.
 DOWNHAM, Jenny. Unbecoming. Scholastic. UK.
 HARDINGE, Frances. The Lie Tree. Abrams. UK.
 LEWIS, Amanda West. The Pact. Red Deer. Canada/set in Germany.
 WILLIAMSON, Lisa. The Art of Being Normal. Farrar/Margaret Ferguson Bks. UK.
 WOLTZ, Anna. A Hundred Hours of Night. tr. from Dutch by Laura Watkinson. Scholastic/Arthur A. Levine Bks. Netherlands.
 WRIGHT, David & Lu Bouchard. Away Running. Orca. Canada/set in France.
 WUNG-SUNG, Jesper. The Last Execution. tr. from Danish by Lindy Falk van Rooyen. Atheneum/Caitlyn Dlouhy Bks. Denmark.

The first 11 OIB Lists (2006–2016)
 2016 Hong, Terry. (2016, February). "Welcome disruptions." School Library Journal. 34-27.
 2015 Dales, Brenda. (2015, February 4). "USBBY Presents Its Annual Outstanding International Books List." School Library Journal.
 2014 Dales, Brenda. (2014, February 24). "Passport to a World of Reading: USBBY's 2014 Outstanding International Books List Introduces Readers to the Global Community." School Library Journal.
 2013 Salvadore, Maria. (2013, February 5). "The Literary Equation: USBBY´s Outstanding International Books connect kids worldwide." School Library Journal.34–37.
 2012 East, Kathy. (2012, February 1). "All Together Now: USBBY´s Outstanding International Books connect kids worldwide." School Library Journal. 44–47.
 2011 Poe, Elizabeth. (2011, February 1). "Here, There, and Everywhere: The United States Board on Books for Young People cites 40 international books for its * 2011 honor list." School Library Journal. 42–46.
 2010 Pope, Elizabeth. (2010, February 1). "Crisscrossing the Globe: A World of International Books for Young People." School Library Journal. 42–45.
 2009 Angus, Carolyn. (2009, February 1). "World Class: The Latest Outstanding International Books List Offers Tales that Speak to Every Student." School Library Journal. 36–39.
 2008 Angus, Carolyn. (2008, February 1). "A World of Stories: 2008 Outstanding International Books." School Library Journal. 44–47.
 2007 Isaacs, Kathleen. (2007, February 1). "Book Your Trip Now: The Outstanding International Booklist Is Just the Ticket to Take Readers to Some Faraway Places." School Library Journal. 44–48.
 2006 Isaacs, Kathleen. (2006, February 1). "It´s a Big World After All: Books Are the Best Way to Open Kids´ Minds." School Library Journal. 40–44

References

American children's literary awards
Awards established in 2006
International Board on Books for Young People